The discography of Australian singer-songwriter, musician, music producer and engineer Tash Sultana consists of two studio albums, two extended plays, and 21 singles. Sultana has achieved one number-one album, and one number-two album on Australia's ARIA Albums Chart.

The single "Jungle" was voted into third place in Triple J's Hottest 100 countdown of 2016. The following year, Sultana had three songs voted into Triple J's Hottest 100 countdown of 2017; "Mystik" placing at number 28, "Murder to the Mind" at number 43, and their Like a Version cover of MGMT's "Electric Feel" at number 78.

Sultana is credited with two double platinum-certified singles from ARIA for "Notion" and "Jungle", while "Mystik" has received single Platinum ARIA certification. Sultana has also been credited with three gold-certified singles from ARIA, for "Murder to the Mind", "Talk It Out" (their collaboration with Australian musician Matt Corby), and "Pretty Lady".

Sultana self-released their own extended play, Yin Yang in 2013, which has since been removed from the internet. They also released the now-removed singles "Higher" and "Brainflower" in 2015.

Albums

Studio albums

Live albums

Notes

Extended Plays

Singles

Other charted songs

References

Discographies of Australian artists
Blues discographies
Soul music discographies